Duane Stadium is a 4,000-seat multi-purpose stadium in North Andover, Massachusetts. It is the home of the Merrimack Warriors field hockey, football, lacrosse, and track & field programs. The stadium includes a turf field and an eight-lane track.

References

American football venues in Massachusetts
Athletics (track and field) venues in Massachusetts
Lacrosse venues in Massachusetts
Multi-purpose stadiums in the United States
Merrimack Warriors
2017 establishments in Massachusetts
Sports venues completed in 2017